Saint Mary's College C.S.Sp. (Congregatio Sancti Spiritus) is a voluntary boys' primary and secondary school run by the Congregation of the Holy Spirit and located in Rathmines, Dublin, Ireland. The school was founded in 1890, closed in 1916, and then reopened in 1926 (from 1917 until 1926 the St. Mary's operated as a House of Philosophy for the Spiritans, before it moved to Blackrock.). The school colours are blue and white.

Notable past pupils

Arts and media
Vincent Dowling – Irish-American director
Frank Fitzgibbon - editor of The Sunday Times Irish edition
Larry Gogan – broadcaster
Ulick O'Connor — writer, historian and critic

Law
Peter Charleton — Judge of the Supreme Court of Ireland
Nicholas Kearns – Former President of the High Court of Ireland
Tom O'Higgins – Former Chief Justice of the Supreme Court
Brian O'Moore — Judge of the High Court

Politics
Kevin Barry (briefly) – Irish republican (executed in 1920)
Eoin Ryan – former MEP for Dublin

Sports
Paul Dean – Former Irish and Lions rugby player
Gareth Delany — Irish cricketer
Denis Hickie – Former Leinster, Irish and Lions rugby player 
Shane Jennings – Former Leinster, Leicester tigers, barbarians and Irish rugby player
Kieran Lewis – Former leinster, Munster and irish Rugby player
Darragh MacAnthony – Chairman of Peterborough United FC
Ronan McCormack – Former Leinster and UCD Rugby player
Jack McGrath – Leinster, Ulster, Irish and lions Rugby player 
Rodney O'Donnell – Former Leinster, Irish and Lions rugby player
Johnny Sexton – Leinster, racing 92, Irish and Lions rugby player
Tony Ward – Former Irish and Lions rugby player and League of Ireland footballer. Only person to win in Rugby & FAI Championships
Darragh Fanning — Former Leinster and Connaught Rugby player
Declan Fanning — Former Leinster Rugby Player
Sean Lynch – Former Leinster, Irish & BILs rugby player
Robert Daly (athletics)- Irish Olympian 2000, 400m Relay and world medalist

Other
Peter Boylan — Former Master of the National Maternity Hospital
Frs. Tom and Ernest Farrell – Founders of the Catholic Boy Scouts of Ireland in 1927
Fergal Keane - news correspondent and author
Thomas Lynch (psychiatrist) – first professor of psychiatry at the Royal College of Surgeons in Ireland
David O'Sullivan — Former Ambassador of the European Union to the United States of America
John Mark Redmond – cardiothoracic surgeon and businessperson

Notable staff
Éamon de Valera – Taoiseach and former president, taught at St. Mary's for a short time in 1915 as a mathematics professor

Sister schools
The following schools were also founded by the Holy Ghost Fathers in Ireland:

Blackrock College
Rockwell College
St. Michael's College
Templeogue College

St. Mary's College Rugby Club
Saint Mary's College C.S.Sp. is directly associated with the St. Mary's College Rugby Club located in Templeogue. The club has been home to some of Leinster and Ireland's greatest rugby players.

References

External links

St. Mary's College RFC – rugby club's official website

Educational institutions established in 1890
Spiritan schools
Private schools in the Republic of Ireland
Catholic secondary schools in the Republic of Ireland
Boys' schools in the Republic of Ireland
Secondary schools in Dublin (city)
Catholic primary schools in the Republic of Ireland
Primary schools in Dublin (city)
1890 establishments in Ireland